Arthur Leonard "Red" Swanson Sr. (April 19, 1905 – November 4, 1987) was an American football, basketball, and baseball coach. He served as the head football coach at Southeastern Louisiana College—now known as Southeastern Louisiana University—from 1931 to 1937 and at Southwestern Louisiana Institute of Liberal and Technical Learning—now known as the University of Louisiana at Lafayette—in 1950 compiling career college football coaching record of 46–21–4.

From 1943 to 1945 he served as head coach of the LSU Tigers baseball team. His record as LSU's baseball coach was 28–23 and led the 1943 team to a Southeastern Conference (SEC) championship. During the 1944–45 LSU Tigers basketball season, he served as head coach for the final six games, compiling a 4–2 record.

Swanson's son, also nicknamed Red Swanson, was a pitcher for the Pittsburgh Pirates of Major League Baseball from 1955 to 1957. The elder Swanson was married to Billie Hightower and died in 1987.

Head coaching record

Football

Basketball

Baseball

References

External links
 

1905 births
1987 deaths
American football fullbacks
American football guards
American football tackles
Louisiana Ragin' Cajuns football coaches
LSU Tigers baseball coaches
LSU Tigers basketball coaches
LSU Tigers football coaches
LSU Tigers football players
Southeastern Louisiana Lions football coaches
College men's basketball head coaches in the United States
People from Jackson Parish, Louisiana
Coaches of American football from Louisiana
Players of American football from Louisiana
Baseball coaches from Louisiana
Basketball coaches from Louisiana